The annual Premios MTV Latinoamérica 2006 took place on October 19, 2006 in Mexico City at Palacio de los Deportes for the first time.

They were the first MTV awards celebrated in Latin America and the ceremony returned in style after last year's awards were cancelled due to Hurricane Wilma approaching to the Riviera Maya and all of the presenters for the 2006 ceremony apologized to viewers during the broadcast for such.

Nominations
Winners in bold.

Artist of the Year
 Belanova
 Daddy Yankee
 Gustavo Cerati
 Julieta Venegas
 La Oreja de Van Gogh

Video of the Year
 Calle 13 — "Atrévete-te-te"
 Gustavo Cerati — "Crimen"
 Julieta Venegas — "Me Voy"
 Maná — "Labios Compartidos"
 Miranda! — "El Profe"

Song of the Year
 James Blunt — "You're Beautiful"
 Julieta Venegas — "Me Voy"
 Madonna — "Hung Up"
 Maná — "Labios Compartidos"
 Shakira — "Hips Don't Lie (featuring Wyclef Jean)"

Best Solo Artist
 Daddy Yankee
 Diego Torres
 Gustavo Cerati
 Julieta Venegas
 Tiziano Ferro

Best Group or Duet
 Belanova
 La Oreja de Van Gogh
 Maná
 Miranda!
 Panda

Best Pop Artist
 Belanova
 Diego Torres
 Julieta Venegas
 Kudai
 La Oreja de Van Gogh

Best Rock Artist
 Babasónicos
 Bersuit Vergarabat
 Fobia
 Gustavo Cerati
 Maná

Best Alternative Artist
 Calle 13
 División Minúscula
 El Otro Yo
 Panda
 Zoé

Best Independent Artist
 Charlie 3
 Chucknorris
 Dani Umpi
 Doctor Krápula
 Finde
 Subdivisión
No public voting

Best Pop Artist — International
 Ashlee Simpson
 Kelly Clarkson
 Madonna
 Nelly Furtado
 Robbie Williams

Best Rock Artist — International
 AFI
 Coldplay
 My Chemical Romance
 Placebo
 Red Hot Chili Peppers

Best New Artist — International
 Arctic Monkeys
 Fall Out Boy
 James Blunt
 Pussycat Dolls
 Rihanna

Best Artist — North
 Allison
 Belanova
 Julieta Venegas
 Maná
 Motel

Best New Artist — North
 Allison
 Chetes
 Diego
 Motel
 Nikki Clan

Best Artist — Central
 Andrea Echeverri
 Juanes
 Kudai
 La Pestilencia
 Líbido

Best New Artist — Central
 Doctor Krápula
 Fonseca
 Ilona
 Jeremías
 Maía

Best Artist — South
 Airbag
 Árbol
 Babasónicos
 Diego Torres
 Gustavo Cerati

Best New Artist — South
 Axel
 Entre Ríos
 Flor
 Migue García
 Nerd Kids

MTV Tr3́s Viewer's Choice Award
 Daddy Yankee
 Don Omar
 Luis Fonsi
 Kumbia Kings
 Ricky Martin

Breakthrough Artist
 Allison
 Motel
 Kudai
 Panda
 Zoé

Promising Artist
 Axel
 Calle 13
 División Minúscula
 Fonseca
 Jesse & Joy

MTV Legend Award
 Maná

Performances
 Shakira — "No"
 Julieta Venegas, Kinky and Daddy Yankee — "Me Voy" / "¿A Dónde Van los Muertos?" / "Eres para Mí"
 Evanescence — "Call Me When You're Sober" / "Bring Me to Life"
 Calle 13 and Nelly Furtado — "Atrévete-te-te" / "Maneater" / "No Hay Igual"
 Belanova — "Por Ti"
 Robbie Williams — "Rudebox" / "Rock DJ"
 Miranda! — "El Profe"
 Panda — "Narcicista por Excelencia"
 Maná — "Labios Compartidos"
 Allison and Belinda — "Frágil" / "Ni Freud, Ni Tu Mamá" / "Hips Don't Lie"

Appearances
 Adrián Dárgelos (from Babasónicos), Manolo Cardona and Calle 13 — presented Best Group or Duet
 Roberto Pettinato — performed a comedy routine and introduced Evanescence
 Álex Ubago, Imanol Landeta and Axel — presented Best Pop Artist
 Diego Luna — presented Song of the Year
 Fall Out Boy — introduced Calle 13
 Reik — introduced Belanova
 Johnny Knoxville, Chris Pontius and Blue Demon Jr. — presented Best Solo Artist
 Belinda and Kudai — introduced Robbie Williams
 Carolina "Pampita" Ardohain and Benjamín Vicuña — introduced Miranda!
 Sofía Zámolo, Naty Botero and Camila Sodi — presented Best Pop Artist—International
 Shakira — introduced Maná and presented them the MTV Legend Award
 Nelly Furtado and Sizu Yantra (Ruben Albarran from Café Tacuba) — presented Artist of the Year

Memorable Moments
 Julieta Venegas forgot the lyrics to her own song "Me Voy" and had to be helped by Kinky's lead singer.
 While Robbie Williams was performing "Rudebox" his drummer lost a drumstick but then he recovered it.
 Robbie Williams mooned the audience and kissed some women from it.
 Robbie Williams, after winning a Lengua, screamed "I would like to put this on your clitoris".

Latin American music
MTV Video Music Awards
2006 music awards